"Purity" is a song by American heavy metal band Slipknot. It appears on the band's 10th Anniversary edition of their 1999 self-titled debut album. Due to copyright infringement issues, "Purity" and "Frail Limb Nursery" were removed from the album's original track listing. "Purity" was later released on the re-release of 10th Anniversary edition of the album where it was preluded by the end of "Frail Limb Nursery".

Writing
"Purity" and "Frail Limb Nursery" was inspired by a story published online about a girl named Purity Knight, who was kidnapped and buried alive. The website, called Crime Scene, presents fictional stories as real life crime cases. Originally, the website included no disclaimer saying that it was a work of fiction. Many readers believed the story to be true, including Corey Taylor: "I still think the story's real. It fucked our whole world up when we read it. Can you imagine a girl being buried in a box and have all this lecherous bullshit drip down on her from this guy? It just hurts your head."

According to Taylor, the song "was originally called 'Despise' but it didn't work when we tried to put it together… Ross [Robinson] took it and helped us restructure it." In a Q&A, Taylor claimed the lyrics had been written five years prior to the song's release, that only the name had been inspired by the Purity Knight story and that inspiration came from films such as Boxing Helena and The Collector, and not the story.

"Frail Limb Nursery" is the prelude to "Purity", and directly samples the audio used on Crime Scene. The outro of the track "Tattered & Torn" features the intro to "Frail Limb Nursery" on the later edition of the album, though the latter was never included on any rereleases.

Release and controversy 
After the album's release, the band had to remove the track after allegations of copyright infringement. The website that inspired the song presents fictional stories as real life crime cases, and originally included no disclaimer saying that it was a work of fiction. The case was complicated by audio samples from the authoring website being included in "Frail Limb Nursery", the prelude to "Purity".

However, to prevent the entire album being pulled, the band removed "Purity" and "Frail Limb Nursery". Slightly remastered standard and digipak versions of the album were issued in December 1999, replacing both tracks with "Me Inside". Although "Frail Limb Nursery" was never rereleased, "Purity" was included on the DVD Disasterpieces, the live 9.0: Live, the greatest hits album Antennas to Hell, and the studio version on 10th anniversary edition of Slipknot.

Personnel 

Slipknot
 (#8) Corey Taylor – vocals
 (#7) Mick Thomson – guitars
 (#6) Shawn "Clown" Crahan - percussion, backing vocals 
 (#5) Craig "133" Jones - samples, media
 (#4) Jim Root – guitars
 (#3) Chris Fehn – percussion, backing vocals 
 (#2) Paul Gray - bass, backing vocals
 (#1) Joey Jordison - drums, mixing
 (#0) Sid Wilson - turntables

Production
 Ross Robinson – producer, mixing
 Rob Agnello – engineering
 Chuck Johnson – engineering, mixing
 Joey Jordison and Sean McMahon – additional mixing
 Kevin Miles – mixing
 Steven Remote – location recording engineer
 Eddy Schreyer – mastering at Oasis Mastering, Studio City, California

Artwork
 Stefan Seskis – album cover, tray card photography
 Dean Karr – band photography
 T42Design – album design, lettering
 Lynda Kusnetz – creative director
 Slipknot – packing concept

Management
 Steve Richards – worldwide management for No Name Management
 Ross Robinson – A&R
 Monte Conner – A&R for Roadrunner Records
 Jeffrey Light – legal representation
 Dave Kirby – booking for The Agency Group

References 

1999 songs
Slipknot (band) songs
Songs written by Paul Gray (American musician)
Songs written by Joey Jordison
Songs written by Corey Taylor